Jaliq (also Romanized as Jālīq; also known as Jāleq) is a village in Bozkosh Rural District, in the Central District of Ahar County, East Azerbaijan Province, Iran. At the 2006 census, its population was 47, in 9 families.

References 

Populated places in Ahar County